Noah is a 2010–2011 Philippine adventure fantasy drama television series directed by Malu L. Sevilla and Lino S. Cayetano. The series stars Piolo Pascual and Zaijian Jaranilla. The series premiered on ABS-CBN's Primetime Bida nighttime block, replacing Kung Tayo'y Magkakalayo on its timeslot from July 12, 2010 to February 4, 2011.

Series overview

Episodes

2010

Episodes 1–4
Due to weather problems caused by the typhoon Basyang, these episodes were replayed as marathon named "Noah: The Marathon Special" on July 17, 2010.

Episodes 5–45

Episodes 46–85

Episodes 86–124

2011

Episodes 125–149

References

Lists of Philippine drama television series episodes
2010s television-related lists